Paul Stuart Widdowson (born 27 March 1974) is an English cricketer.  Widdowson is a right-handed batsman who bowls right-arm medium pace.  He was born at Leicester, Leicestershire.

Widdowson represented the Leicestershire Cricket Board in a single List A match against the Durham Cricket Board in the 2000 NatWest Trophy.  In his only List A match he scored 11 runs and with the ball he took a single wicket at a cost of 12 runs.

He currently plays club cricket for Kegworth Town Cricket Club in the Leicestershire Premier Cricket League.

References

External links
Paul Widdowson at Cricinfo
Paul Widdowson at CricketArchive

1974 births
Living people
Cricketers from Leicester
English cricketers
Leicestershire Cricket Board cricketers